Pegida, full name Patriotic Europeans Against the Islamisation of the West (Occident), abbreviated PEGIDA or Pegida, is a German nationalist, anti-Islam, right-wing political movement.

Pegida may also refer to:

Pegida Ireland
Pegida Netherlands
Pegida Switzerland
Pegida UK